Cape Svyatoy Nos ('Holy Cape') is a headland in the Kola Peninsula, located between the Barents Sea and the White Sea. It separates Svyatonossky Gulf from the Barents Sea.

There are a Russian weather station, a lighthouse, and a military base near Cape Svyatoy Nos today.

References

Svyatoy Nos
Landforms of Murmansk Oblast